The Conway Commercial Historic District encompasses the historic commercial heart of Conway, Arkansas.  The area, roughly bounded by Main Street on the south, Harkrider and Spencer Streets on the east, just south of Mill Street to the north, and Locust Street to the west, was developed between 1879 and 1960, and includes representative architecture from four major phases of the city's development.  It includes the city's oldest commercial building, the 1879 Frauenthal & Schwarz Building.

The district was listed on the National Register of Historic Places in 2001.

See also
National Register of Historic Places listings in Faulkner County, Arkansas

References

Historic districts on the National Register of Historic Places in Arkansas
Queen Anne architecture in Arkansas
Colonial Revival architecture in Arkansas
Geography of Faulkner County, Arkansas
National Register of Historic Places in Faulkner County, Arkansas
Buildings and structures in Conway, Arkansas